Leptaxis erubescens is a species of air-breathing land snail, a terrestrial pulmonate gastropod mollusk in the family Helicidae, the typical snails.

Anatomy

These snails create and use love darts as part of their mating behavior.
The scanning electron microscope images shown are as follows: the upper image shows the lateral view of the dart, scale bar is 500 μm (0.5 mm). The lower image show the cross-section of the darts; the scale bar is 50 μm.

References

Leptaxis
Taxa named by Richard Thomas Lowe
Gastropods described in 1831

pt:Leptaxis